Pavel Cichi (born 8 August 1943) is a Romanian rower. He competed in the men's coxless four event at the 1968 Summer Olympics.

References

1943 births
Living people
People from Iași County
Romanian male rowers
Olympic rowers of Romania
Rowers at the 1968 Summer Olympics